Thomaston is an unincorporated community in southeastern DeWitt County, Texas, United States.  It lies along U.S. Route 87 southeast of the city of Cuero, the county seat of DeWitt County.  Its elevation is 161 feet (49 m).  Although Thomaston is unincorporated, it has a post office, with the ZIP code of 77989.

Founded along the Gulf, Western Texas and Pacific Railroad in 1872, the community was named for Nathan Thomas, who had previously owned part of the land on which the community was built.  The community's post office was opened in 1873; schools were started early in the community's history, although local students now attend the Cuero schools.  Thomaston has declined in recent decades as non-railroad transportation has become significant.

References

External links
Profile of Thomaston from the Handbook of Texas Online

Unincorporated communities in DeWitt County, Texas
Unincorporated communities in Texas
1872 establishments in Texas
Populated places established in 1872
Populated places on the Guadalupe River (Texas)